The Kings of  or Moylurg were a branch of the , and a kindred family to the  Kings of Connacht. His dynasty was known as the Clan Mulrooney, and later still took the surname of MacDermot (a branch of this family were in turn called MacDermot Roe). The following is a list of their Kings, followed by the respective heads of the family up to the present day.

The Kings of Moylurg
 , fl. 956 founder of Moylurg and the Clan .
 
 
 , fl. 1080.
 , 1120–1124.
 , 1124.
 , 1124–1159, progenitor of the surname MacDermot.
 , 1159–1187.
 , 1187–1196.
 , 1196–1207.
 , 1207–1215.
 , 1215–1218. 
 , 1218–1244
 , 1245–1265
 , 1256–1281.
 , 1281–1287
 , 1288–1294
 , 1294–1331. 
 , 1331–1336.
 , 1336–1343
 , 1343–1368.
 , 1368–1393.
 , 1393–1398.
 , 1398–1404.
 , 1404–1421.
 , 1421–1458.
 , 1458–1465.
 , 1456–1478.
 , 1478–1486.
 , 1486–1497.
 , 1497–1499.
 , 1499–1528.
 , 1528–1533.
 , 1533–1534.
 , 1534–1549.
, at Christmas of this year; and it is not possible to count or over-reckon all that he gave to the poets, and professors, and learned men of Erinn, and to all men besides.
 , 1568–1576.
 , 1576–1585, last de facto King of Moylurg.

The MacDermot of the Carrick
 , 1585–1595, first to be styled "MacDermot of the Carrick"
 , 1595–1603.
 , 1603–1636.

The Chief of the Name
 Turlough MacDermot, 1636 – c.1652, first to be styled Chief of the name.
 Cathal Roe MacDermot, c.1652 – c.1694.
 Hugh MacDermott, c.1694 – 1707.

The Prince of Coolavin
 Charles MacDermott, 1707–1758, first to be styled Prince of Coolavin.
 Myles MacDermot, died 1758–1792.
 Hugh MacDermott, M.D., 1792–1824.
 Charles Joseph MacDermot, J.P., 1824–1873.
 Hugh Hyacinth O'Rorke MacDermot, 1873–1904.
 Charles Edward MacDermot, 1904–1947.
 Charles John MacDermot, 1947–1979.
 Dermot MacDermot, 1979–1989.
 Niall Anthony MacDermot, 1989–2003.
 Rory MacDermot, 2004–2021.

See also
 Irish royal families

References
 "Mac Dermot of Moylurg: The Story of a Connacht Family", Dermot Mac Dermot, 1996.
 http://www.macdermot.com/ 

Connachta
MacDermot family
Moylurg